Maidla is a village in Lüganuse Parish, Ida-Viru County in northeastern Estonia.

Maidla Manor
Maidla manor traces its  history back to at least 1465, although the village is mentioned for the first time as early as the 13th century, in the Danish Census Book. The manor estate has over the centuries belonged to several different aristocratic families. The present baroque manor house was built in 1764-1767 according to plans by architect J. P. Dürschmidt, during the ownership of the Wrangel family. After the Estonian land reform that followed the declaration of independence of Estonia in 1919, the manor was converted into a school. The manor is a fine example of baroque manor house architecture in Estonia. Details such as the finely carved door, interior stucco decoration and the pediment decorated with coats-of-arms, survive.

See also
 List of palaces and manor houses in Estonia

References

External links
Maidla Manor at Estonian Manors Portal

Villages in Ida-Viru County
Lüganuse Parish
Kreis Wierland
Baroque palaces in Estonia

et:Maidla